Sherwadeeh is a village in Basti district, Tehsil Harraiya, state Uttar Pradesh, India.
Sherwadeeh has a Census of India Village-code 179839

Geography
Sherwadeeh is located at

Nearest places

Shringinari
Vikramjot
Chhawani
'Amorha- Historical Place of Raja Zalim Singh known as pargana Amorha
Makhauda Dham
Harraiya - Tehsil & Police Station
Basti - District
Gonda
Ayodhya Nearest District
Faizabad

Nearest railway station
The Nearest Indian Railways Station is Babhnan Railway Station, Basti  railway station, Ayodhya railway station Faizabad railway station with distance of 26.5 km.

Higher education
The institute for higher education, J.K Inter College Lalpur Bedipur Basti '' , National Inter College Harraiya basti, Acharya Narendra Dev College of Pharmacy Babhnan, Nandani Nagar 
MahaVidayala

Gallery

 Sherwadeeh Village Primary School

References

Villages in Basti district
Cities and towns in Basti district